Sima Katić Prekodrinac (1783–1833) was a Serbian duke and a participant in the Serbian revolution against the Ottoman Empire.

He took part in the Battle of Ravna in August 1813 as part of the First Serbian Uprising. When the uprising was suppressed, Sima Katic fled to Austria with many other dukes to escape Ottoman retaliation. He returned to Serbia when the Second Serbian Uprising began in 1815 and settled in Glogovac. There he became a founding member of a newly-built church. Sima Katić remembered Karadjordje generosity when he went to Mačva after the Battle of Mišar in 1806 and found only three existing churches, Crna Bara, one between Belotić and Metković, and the third in Glušci. Karadjordje donated a church bell to each village as gratitude for the people's participation in the uprising.

References 

1783 births
1833 deaths